Elena Ţurcan (born 11 June 1975) is a Moldovan former footballer who played as a midfielder. She has been a member of the Moldova women's national team.

International career
Ţurcan capped for Moldova at senior level during the UEFA second categories of two FIFA Women's World Cup qualifiers (2003 and 2007).

References

1975 births
Living people
Women's association football midfielders
Moldovan women's footballers
People from Ștefan Vodă District
Moldova women's international footballers
Ryazan-VDV players
Gintra Universitetas players
Moldovan expatriate footballers
Moldovan expatriate sportspeople in Russia
Expatriate women's footballers in Russia
Moldovan expatriate sportspeople in Lithuania
Expatriate women's footballers in Lithuania